Athira Patel is an Indian actress who mainly appears in Malayalam films. She made her acting debut in 2016 with the Sanskrit film Ishti. She is best known for playing the role of Vincent Pepe's sister in Angamaly Diaries.

Personal life 
Speaking about her last name in an interview given to the Deccan Chronicle, she said that her paternal grandfather was a village head in Karnataka, who are called Patelars, which is how her last name, Patel, was derived.

Career 
She did her first role in a short film named Vuja De, written and directed by Joby Varghese. Later in 2016, she debuted in a Sanskrit film Ishti in which she played the role of actor Nedumudi Venu's third wife. Patel played Mercy in the 2017 film Angamaly Diaries, which was directed by Lijo Jose Pellissery. In the same year she acted in Villain and Aadu 2.

She plays the female lead opposite to Appani Sarath in Contessa.

Filmography

References

External links 
 

Living people
21st-century Indian actresses
Actresses from Thrissur
Actresses in Malayalam cinema
Indian film actresses
Year of birth missing (living people)